Blow Out is a reality television series that first premiered on the Bravo cable television network in 2004, with a second season broadcasting in 2005.  The first season revolved around the construction and launch of Jonathan Salon in Beverly Hills, an upscale Los Angeles hair salon. The second season showed the ongoing business ventures of now celebrity hair stylist Jonathan Antin, including the management of his (two) salons and the launch of his own hair styling product. A third season premiered on March 21, 2006. Season 3 chronicled Jonathan's product launch and growing popularity in the fashion industry.

The Beverly Hills salon, located at 9681 Wilshire Blvd in Beverly Hills, is no longer Antin's and operates under Tom Brophy's Salon as of 2012.

References

External links
 
 

Fashion-themed reality television series
Bravo (American TV network) original programming
2004 American television series debuts
2006 American television series endings
2000s American reality television series
Television series by Reveille Productions
English-language television shows